Greenpark Productions Ltd is a British documentary film production company, founded by Walter Greenwood in Polperro, Cornwall in 1938. The company relocated to London in 1939. After the war it expanded into making upmarket corporate films. Amongst its roster of directors were Ken Annakin, Ralph Keene and Humphrey Swingler, brother of the poet Randall Swingler.

Greenpark Productions was a founding member of the Film Producers Guild, which set new standards for UK documentary film production. The company, together with its film archive, was acquired in 1977 by David Morphet, an award-winning documentary film producer. Greenpark Productions Ltd is still in business as a film archive, based in Cornwall. (www.greenparkimages.co.uk)

Filmography
This filmography below is a list of films produced or co-produced by Greenpark Productions.

Notes

References

Film production companies of the United Kingdom
Propaganda film units
1938 establishments in the United Kingdom